Destinazione paradiso is the first studio album by Italian singer-songwriter Gianluca Grignani. The album, produced by Massimo Luca and Vince Tempera, has sold about 650,000 copies in Italy during 1995, and it has later passed 700,000 copies domestically and about 1,000,000 copies abroad, mainly in South America, where a Spanish-language version of the record was released under the title Destino paraíso.

Thanks to the success achieved by the album, Grignani was awarded with a Telegatto for Revelation of the Year in 1995.

Background
The album is mainly composed of melodic ballads focusing on young generations' uneases.
It also contains the singles "La mia storia tra le dita", a pop ballad performed for the first time by Grignani during the televised selection for the 1995 Sanremo Music Festival, and "Destinazione paradiso", his entry for that year's contest, which finished sixth in the newcomers' competition. Another track, "Le-ro-là", was initially composed for the album, but it was not released until 2010, when it was included in Grignani's eighth studio album, Romantico Rock Show.

Track listing

Italian-language edition

Spanish-language edition

Personnel

Music credits
 Gigi Cappellotto – bass
 Margherita Graczyk – orchestra conductor
 Gianluca Grignani – vocals, composer
 Massimo Luca – electric guitars, acoustic guitars, composer, arrangements
 Lele Melotti – drums
 Pier Carlo Penta – Hammond organ, keyboards, programming
 Vince Tempera – keyboards, arrangements

Production credits
 Vince Tempera – producer
 Massimo Luca – record producer
 Umberto Iervolino – pre-producer
 Bruno Malasoma – engineer, mixing
 Antonio Baglio – editing
 Pier Carlo Penta – engineer

Charts

References

1995 debut albums
Italian-language albums
Spanish-language albums
Mercury Records albums
PolyGram albums